The Shapes of Sleep is a 1962 mystery novel by the British writer J.B. Priestley.

References

Bibliography
 Klein, Holger. J.B. Priestley's Fiction. Peter Lang, 2002.

1962 British novels
Novels by J. B. Priestley
British mystery novels
Heinemann (publisher) books